2014 Vegalta Sendai season.

Current players

Out on loan

Competitions

J.League

League table

Matches

J.League Cup

Emperor's Cup

Statistics

Appearances and goals

Honours

J.League Monthly MVP

Others 

 Fair-Play award
 Vegalta Sendai

References 

Vegalta Sendai
Vegalta Sendai seasons